The Canadian province of Alberta holds elections to its unicameral legislative body, the Legislative Assembly of Alberta. The maximum period between general elections of the assembly is five years, but the Lieutenant Governor is able to call one at any time. However, the premier has typically asked the lieutenant governor to call the election in the fourth or fifth year after the preceding election. The number of seats has increased over time, from 25 for the first election in 1905, to the current 87.

Alberta's politics has historically been one of long-lasting governments with government changes being few and far between. The province from 1905 to 2015 was ruled by four "dynasties": the Liberal Party (1905–1921); the United Farmers of Alberta (1921–1935), the Social Credit Party (1935–1971), and the Progressive Conservative (PC) Association (1971–2015), the longest political dynasty in Canada. No minority government has ever been elected.  Thus, Alberta can be said to have continuously had a dominant-party system for its entire political history, though the dominant party has changed over time.

In 2015, the NDP were elected to government for the first time in Alberta's history. The NDP had Alberta's only one term government thus far.

In 2019 the newly formed United Conservative Party formed the government.

From 1905 to 1956, Alberta elections used a combination of single-member and multi-member districts. 
From 1905 to 1924, plurality was enough to be elected.

From 1924 to 1956, each voter cast a ranked ballot, creating a hybrid of Single Transferable Voting in multi-member districts and Instant-runoff voting in single-member districts, producing proportional representation in the cities and majoritarian results elsewhere. Only Alberta and Manitoba have used a proportional representation system for any length of time in the history of Canada, although in both provinces it was applied only partially.

Since 1956, Alberta's elections have used single-member plurality, also known as first past the post.

Summary 
The table below shows the total number of seats won by each political party in each election. Full details on any election are linked via the year of the election at the start of the row, and details for the legislature that followed the election are available at the legislature number.

Notes 
  Known as the Conservative Party prior to 1959.
  Known as the Co-operative Commonwealth Federation (CCF) prior to 1963.
  In 1913, 55 people occupied 56 seats. C.W. Cross was elected in two different districts.

Electoral system
Alberta has used a variety of electoral systems in its history, notably a combination of single transferable vote (STV) and instant-runoff voting (IRV) for nearly four decades.

Electoral systems of Alberta 

Alberta's first election was fought in 25 single-member first past the post districts. The Liberal government, like other Canadian jurisdictions at the time, introduced two-member constituencies in Edmonton and Calgary in 1909 to accommodate their population. Voting in these multi-member districts was by Block Voting.

Each was broken up into three single-member districts by 1917, as the overall number of districts increased rapidly. As well 1917 saw two other innovations - election of two MLAs by soldiers and nurses overseas; and automatic re-election of 11 MLAs who were serving in the armed forces.

The Liberal government introduced five-member Block Voting constituencies in Edmonton and Calgary in 1921, and made the Medicine Hat into a two-member district. Each voter in the cities was given five votes, in Medicine Hat two votes. The Liberal party led the vote in Edmonton (although not taking a majority of the city vote) and its candidates received many multiple votes, together taking more votes than the number of Edmontonians who voted. It won all five of Edmonton's seats. Because each voter cast multiple votes in the cities where UFA ran only one candidate, the Liberal party vote tally is inflated (with many of its supporters casting multiple votes for party candidates) while each UFA vote truly represents an individual voter. Although it did win any seats in the cities, the United Farmers won most of the rural seats. Overall it won a majority of the seats in the Legislature and formed government.

The UFA government, which had campaigned on a promise of electoral reform, retained the existing multi-seat districts and adopted Single Transferable Voting in Edmonton, Calgary and Medicine Hat. Instant-runoff voting (IRV) (AKA Alternative Voting) was put into use elsewhere. STV in Edmonton and Calgary produced mixed roughly proportional results in the election of city MLAs.

IRV elsewhere had little impact as the UFA candidates were extremely popular, usually taking a majority of the vote on the First Count. This would be the pattern for the next two decades with the governing party (UFA then Social Credit) taking a majority of the rural seats, and STV in the cities giving each party its proportion of the city seats. These parallel systems, STV in the cities and IRV in the rest of the province, were used for eight elections over three decades.

During these eight elections the only modifications made were that Albertans serving in armed fores in 1944 elected three armed force representatives, one for each branch - army, navy and air force; Medicine Hat was changed to a single-member district prior to the 1930 election; and the number of MLAs sitting for Edmonton and Calgary changed over time.

Until recently, the pattern has been for one party to take a majority of the seats outside the cities, usually by a majority of the vote outright. Due to the relative small number of seats in the cities, that ensured the party's ascendancy to power. The UFA did not, but the SC and Conservative governments usually took several city seats as well as most of the rural seats.

This pattern was modulated in the 1950s. Due to change to First past the post in the cities, the one-party ascendency was raised to higher level.

In 1955, the SC government was re-elected with a great majority of the seats but for the first time IRV changed the outcome in four districts. In these districts a SC candidate led in the first count but did not take a majority of the vote and each lost out when votes were transferred as per IRV.

Following this turn of events, Ernest Manning's Social Credit government abolished the mixed STV/IRV system, without public consultations or a referendum. The city-wide districts in Edmonton and Calgary were broken up and single-member districts were created, and the use of transferable votes was ended. The government reintroduced first past the post across the province, not seen across the board since 1905. The SC government reaped a windfall of seats in the 1959 election under the new voting system, winning every seat in Edmonton and all but one in Calgary. This result was far in excess of its share of the city vote.

First past the post remains the system used in Alberta and throughout Canada for provincial and federal elections.

See also 
 Timeline of Canadian elections
 List of political parties in Alberta – for present and historical political parties in Alberta.

References 

Alberta general elections
Elections, general